Charles Gilbert may refer to:

 Charles Gilbert (cricketer) (1855–1937), English cricketer
 Charles Allan Gilbert (1873–1929), American artist
 Charles Champion Gilbert (1822–1903), American soldier
 Charles Henry Gilbert (1859–1928), American ichthyologist
 Charles Web Gilbert (1867–1925), Australian sculptor
 Charles Gilbert Jr., American composer, lyricist, writer and educator
 Charles Gilbert (American football) (born 1987), American football wide receiver
 Charles Sandoe Gilbert (1760–1831), Cornish druggist and historian of Cornwall
 Charles Kendall Gilbert (1878–1958), bishop of the Episcopal Diocese of New York
 C. P. H. Gilbert (Charles Pierrepont Henry Gilbert, 1861–1952), American architect